Albanians in Belgium (Albanian: Shqiptarët në Belgjikë) are Albanians that live in Belgium or are Belgians of Albanian descent. They number up to 60,000 people in Belgium. The vast majority emigrated from Serbia, Kosovo, Montenegro, North Macedonia and Albania.

History
On August 1, 1956, the train carrying 700 refugees from southeastern European communist countries arrived at the Seille station in Namur province. These refugees have traveled for 72 hours and among them were hundreds of refugees from Albania. This marks the first wave of Albanian exiles in Belgium. The first wave of Albanian exiles was so-called "elite". The emigrants came mainly from northern Albania, were relatively educated and opposed the communist dictatorship of Enver Hoxha seeking freedom. Albanian political refugees have been welcomed in Belgium and adapted well.  In v. 1968 Skanderbeg Monument was built in Schaerbeek, with money collected from Albanian Diaspora in Belgium and America.

In the 1960s, with immigrants from Turkey, Albanians, who had previously migrated from Yugoslavia to Turkey, came to Belgium. They were followed by guest workers from Yugoslavia in the 1970s and strengthened in the 1980s. 

This first wave of exiles will be followed by the large influx of Kosovo Albanians beginning in the late 1970s and intensified in the 1990s as a result of Serbian repression over Kosovo Albanians. This influx will culminate when Belgrade will massacre over thousands of Albanian civilians and drive out nearly a million Kosovo Albanians in v. Also in the 1990s, a second wave of exiles came from Albania after the collapse of the communist regime. Hundreds of thousands of Albanians, disconnected from the world for 45 years, fleeing poverty in Albania, rush especially to Italy and Greece, but also to Belgium.

Demographics
In addition to Albanian citizens (2,941 people per 2008), there are also numerous Albanians from Kosovo, North Macedonia, Serbia, Greece, Montenegro or Italy. Therefore, it is generally difficult to give an exact number of ethnic Albanian people in a Western European country. In the Brussels region alone, around 40,000 Albanians live, most of them in Schaerbeek.

Notable people

Politics
 Krenar Gashi - Political scientist

Sports
 Adnan Januzaj  -  Belgian professional footballer who plays as a winger for Spanish club Sevilla and the Belgium national team
 Lindon Selahi  -   Albanian professional footballer
 Zymer Bytyqi  -   Kosovar footballer
 Adrian Bakalli  -  Belgian former professional footballer
 Medjon Hoxha  -  Belgian professional footballer
 Rustemi Kreshnik  -   Albanian-Belgian kickboxer
 Sebastjan Spahiu  -   professional footballer
 Din Sula  -   professional footballer
 Emir Ujkani  -   Kosovar football goalkeeper
 Samir Ujkani  -   Kosovar goalkeeper
 Florian Loshaj  -  Belgian professional footballer
 Toni Aliaj  -  professional footballer
 Daniel Dardha  -  Belgian chess grandmaster
 Geralb Smajli  -  Albanian-Belgian professional footballer

Media
 Bleri Lleshi  -    Albanian philosopher and public speaker

References

Ethnic groups in Belgium
Belgian people of Albanian descent
Belgium